Brothers and Sisters of the Eternal Son  is the eleventh studio album by American rock musician Damien Jurado. It was released January 21, 2014, by Secretly Canadian. The album was announced in the middle of October with a short trailer and an essay by Father John Misty. Jurado described the album as "sort of a sequel to Maraqopa... it is about a guy who disappears on a search, if you will, for himself and never goes home".

The album cover are features a manipulated photo of one of the three glass domes at the Mitchell Park Horticultural Conservatory in Milwaukee, WI.

Track listing

References

Damien Jurado albums